

See also
 2007 in Australia
 2007 in Australian television
 List of 2007 box office number-one films in Australia

2007
Australia
Films